The year 1891 in architecture involved some significant architectural events and new buildings.

Buildings and structures

Buildings

 October 7 — Uris Library at Cornell University, designed by William Henry Miller, opens
 Ludington Building – Chicago, designed by William Le Baron Jenney, earliest surviving steel-framed building in the city, and the earliest entirely terracotta-clad skyscraper (8 storeys).
 Manhattan Building – Chicago, designed by William Le Baron Jenney, completed; world's earliest surviving steel-framed building to use a purely skeletal supporting structure.
 Second Leiter Building – Chicago, designed by William Le Baron Jenney.
 Monadnock Building – Chicago, tallest masonry load-bearing wall building when built.
 Sacred Heart Cathedral – Davenport, Iowa, designed by James J. Egan.
 St. Ambrose Cathedral – Des Moines, Iowa, designed by James J. Egan.
 San Sebastian Church (Manila).
 Wainwright Building – St. Louis, Missouri, designed by Dankmar Adler and Louis Sullivan.
 University of Pennsylvania Library – Philadelphia, Pennsylvania, designed by Frank Furness.
 Several buildings constructed for the General Land Centennial Exhibition world fair – Prague, including the Art Nouveau Průmyslový Palace.
 Victoria Hall (Geneva), Switzerland, a concert hall designed by Marc Camoletti.
 Stadttheater Zürich, designed by Fellner & Helmer, opened.
 House of the Estates in Helsinki, Finland, built.
 General Post Office, Birmingham, England, designed by Henry Tanner.
 Palace Theatre, Manchester, England, designed by Alfred Darbyshire.
 Château de l'Île (Schloss Inselburg), Ostwald, Bas-Rhin, France (then Germany).

Awards
 RIBA  Royal Gold Medal – Arthur Blomfield.
 Grand Prix de Rome, architecture: Henri Eustache.

Births
 January 2 – Giovanni Michelucci, Italian architect, urban planner and engraver (died 1990)
 August 2 – Joseph Charles Fowell, Australian architect (died 1970)
 date unknown – Giuseppe Psaila, Maltese Art Nouveau architect (died 1960)

Deaths
 January 11 – Baron Haussmann, French civic planner notable for the rebuilding of Paris in the 1860s (born 1809)
 January 15 – John Wellborn Root, Chicago architect (born 1850; pneumonia)
 January 22 – Miklós Ybl, Hungarian architect (born 1814)
 January 23 – Friedrich von Schmidt, Austrian architect working in Vienna (born 1825)
 March 19 – Jānis Frīdrihs Baumanis, Latvian architect (born 1834)
 April 7 – J. D. Sedding, English ecclesiastical architect (born 1838)
 May 7 – John Hayward, English Gothic Revival architect (born 1807)

References